Regulatory agencies

May relate to

List of United States federal agencies
Central Electricity Regulatory Commission (India)

or to regulatory agencies in other countries.